Masoud Daneshvar (born 30 January 1988) is an Iranian former professional futsal player.

Honours

Country 
 AFC Futsal Championship
 Champion (1): 2010
 Asian Indoor Games
 Champion (2): 2007 - 2009
 WAFF Futsal Championship
 Champion (1): 2007

Club 
 AFC Futsal Club Championship
 Runner-Up (1): 2011 (Shahid Mansouri)
 Iranian Futsal Super League
 Runner-Up (2): 2010–11 (Giti Pasand) - 2011–12 (Giti Pasand)
 Iranian Futsal Hazfi Cup
 Champion (1): 2013–14 (Mahan Tandis)

Individual 
 Top Goalscorer:
 Iranian Futsal Super League: 2010–11 (Giti Pasand) (24)

References

External links 
 
 

1988 births
Living people
People from Shiraz
Iranian men's futsal players
Futsal forwards
Sadra Shiraz FSC players
Giti Pasand FSC players
Shahid Mansouri FSC players
Arjan Shiraz FSC players
Almas Shahr Qom FSC players
Iranian expatriate futsal players
Iranian expatriate sportspeople in Kuwait
Iranian expatriate sportspeople in China
Sportspeople from Fars province